The 2003 season of the African Cup Winners' Cup football club tournament was won by Étoile Sportive du Sahel in two-legged final victory against Julius Berger (now Bridge Boys F.C.). Étoile Sportive du Sahel never had the opportunity to defend their title as the African Cup Winners' Cup was merged with CAF Cup the following season into CAF Confederation Cup.

Thirty-six sides entered the competition. It was the first season when the CAF started to take disciplinary actions against teams withdrawing from the competition by banning them for three years. These actions were taken against Masvingo United from Zimbabwe who withdrew before the first leg of the preliminary round and JS Pobè from Benin who failed to show for their first leg match of the first round. Tanzania was not represented by JKT Ruvu Stars after the Tanzania Football Federation failed to confirm participation to CAF, while Liberian side Mighty Blue Angles were disqualified following failure to meet the deadline for submitting players' licenses. No disciplinary actions were taken against either team.

Preliminary round

|}

 Tanzania was not represented by JKT Ruvu Stars after the Tanzanian Football Federation failed to confirm participation to CAF

First leg

Masvingo United withdrew before 1st leg and were subsequently banned for 3 years by CAF

Second leg

Olympique de Moka won 3-2 on aggregate

Jomo Cosmos won 7-3 on aggregate

JS Pobè won 2-0 on aggregate

First round

|}

First leg

Match played in Kinshasa as Lubumbashi pitch (Stade Frederic Kibassa Maliba) considered into too poor condition

JS Pobè did not show for the match and was subsequently banned for 3 years by CAF

Mighty Blue Angles disqualified following failure to meet dead-line for submitting players' licenses

Second leg

Wydad Casablanca won 2-0 on aggregate

Baladeyet El Mahalla won 4-1 on aggregate

Kenya Pipeline 3-3 Anse Réunion. Kenya Pipeline won 9-8 on PSO

Power Dynamos won 3-1 on aggregate

Africa Sports won 3-2 on aggregate

Hafia FC won 3-2 on aggregate

Al Hilal (Benghazi) 2-2 WA Tlemcen on aggregate. Al Hilal (Benghazi) won on away goals (1-2)

Mount Cameroon won 2-1 on aggregate

APR FC won 9-2 on aggregate

Étoile du Congo won 2-1 on aggregate

Al Hilal (Omdurman) won 4-0 on aggregate

Julius Berger won 8-0 on aggregate

Cercle Olympique de Bamako won 3-0 on aggregate

Second round

|}

First leg

Second leg

Africa Sports won 3-2 on aggregate

Baladeyet El Mahalla won 4-2 on aggregate

Power Dynamos won 3-0 on aggregate

Julius Berger won 4-2 on aggregate

Asante Kotoko won 5-4 on aggregate

APR FC won 5-1 on aggregate

Wydad Casablanca won 6-2 on aggregate

Étoile Sportive du Sahel won 4-2 on aggregate

Quarterfinals

|}

First leg

Second leg

Julius Berger won 4-2 on aggregate

Wydad Casablanca 2-2 Power Dynamos on aggregate. Wydad Casablanca won on away goals (1-2)

Étoile Sportive du Sahel won 3-1 on aggregate

APR FC 2-2 Asante Kotoko. APR FC won on away goals (1-2)

Semifinals

|}

First leg

Second leg

Julius Berger won 3-2 on aggregate

Étoile Sportive du Sahel won 3-0 on aggregate

Final

|}

First leg

Second leg

BBC reported first goal as scored by Ibrahima KonéÉtoile Sportive du Sahel won 3-2 on aggregate

See also
 2003 CAF Champions League
 2003 CAF Cup

External links
 Results available on CAF Official Website
 Results available on RSSSF

2
African Cup Winners' Cup